The 2014–15 season is Gillingham's 122nd season in existence.

Transfers

Match details

Pre-season

League One

League table

Matches
The fixtures for the 2014–15 season were announced on 18 June 2014 at 9am.

FA Cup

The draw for the first round of the FA Cup was made on 27 October 2014.

League Cup

The draw for the first round was made on 17 June 2014 at 10am. Gillingham were drawn away to Yeovil Town.

Football League Trophy

References

Gillingham F.C. seasons
Gillingham
2010s in Kent